The noisy channel model is a framework used in spell checkers,
question answering, speech recognition, and machine translation.
In this model, the goal is to find the intended word given a word where the
letters have been scrambled in some manner.

In spell-checking 
See Chapter B of.

Given an alphabet , let  be the set
Let the dictionary
.

The noisy channel is the matrix

,

where  is the intended word and 
is the scrambled word that was actually received.

The goal of the noisy channel model is to find the intended word given the
scrambled word that was received. The decision function
 is a function that, given a scrambled word, returns
the intended word.

Methods of constructing a decision function include the
maximum likelihood rule, the
maximum a posteriori rule, and the
minimum distance rule.

In some cases, it may be better to accept the scrambled word as the intended
word rather than attempt to find an intended word in the dictionary. For
example, the word schönfinkeling may not be in the dictionary, but might
in fact be the intended word.

Example 
Consider the English alphabet
. Some subset
 makes up the dictionary of valid English
words.

There are several mistakes that may occur while typing, including:

 Missing letters, e.g.,  instead of letter
 Accidental letter additions, e.g.,  instead of mistake
 Swapping letters, e.g.,  instead of received
 Replacing letters, e.g.,  instead of finite

To construct the noisy channel matrix , we must consider
the probability of each mistake, given the intended word
( for all  and
). These probabilities may be gathered, for
example, by considering the Damerau–Levenshtein distance between 
been manually edited for spelling.

In machine translation 

See chapter 1, and chapter 25 of.

Suppose we want to translate a foreign language to English, we could model  directly: the probability that we have English sentence E given foreign sentence F, then we pick the most likely one . However, by Bayes law, we have the equivalent equation:Consequently, if we have a good model of English, and a good English-to-foreign translator, we immediately get a good foreign-to-English translator.

In speech recognition 
Speech recognition can be thought of as translating from a sound-language to a text-language. Consequently, we havewhere  is the probability that a speech sound S is produced if the speaker is intending to say text T. Intuitively, this equation states that the most likely text is a text that's both a likely text in the language, and produces the speech sound with high probability.

The utility of the noisy-channel model is not in capacity. Theoretically, any noisy-channel model can be replicated by a direct  model. However, the noisy-channel model factors the model into two parts which are appropriate for the situation, and consequently it is generally more well-behaved.

When a human speaks, it does not produce the sound directly, but first produces the text it wants to speak in the language centers of the brain, then the text is translated into sound by the motor cortex, vocal cords, and other parts of the body. The noisy-channel model matches this model of the human, and so it is appropriate. This is justified in the practical success of noisy-channel model in speech recognition.

Example 
Consider the sound-language sentence (written in IPA for English) S = aɪ wʊd laɪk wʌn tuː. There are three possible texts : 

  I would like one to.
  I would like one too.
  I would like one two.

that are equally likely, in the sense that . With a good English language model, we would have , since the second sentence is grammatical, the first is not quite, but close to a grammatical one (such as "I would like one to [go]."), while the third one is far from grammatical. 

Consequently, the noisy-channel model would output  as the best transcription.

See also 

 Coding theory

References 

 

Automatic identification and data capture
Computational linguistics
Statistical natural language processing